The Certificate of Deposit Account Registry Service (CDARS), was a US  for-profit service that broke up large deposits (from individuals, companies, nonprofits, public funds, etc.) and placed them across a network of more than 3000 banks and savings associations around the United States. This allowed depositors to deal with a single bank that participates in CDARS but avoid having funds above the Federal Deposit Insurance Corporation (FDIC) deposit insurance limits in any one bank.

In 2021, the service was reconfigured with several other offerings of IntraFi Network (formerly Promontory Interfinancial Network) into IntraFi Network Deposits and IntraFi Funding.

How it works
The service can place multiple millions in deposits per customer and make all of it qualify for FDIC insurance coverage. A customer can achieve a similar result, as far as FDIC insurance is concerned, by going to a traditional deposit broker or opening accounts directly at multiple banks (although depending on the amount this could require a lot more paperwork). With IntraFi deposits, the customer’s local bank sets the interest rate that will be paid on the entire deposit amount, and the customer gets one consolidated statement from that bank.

The FDIC has confirmed that deposits placed through deposit placement service offered by the IntraFi Network are eligible for “pass-through” FDIC insurance. The FDIC has not endorsed any particular method of maximizing FDIC insurance coverage, but states that depositors should “protect all (their) deposits with FDIC insurance.”

References
Specific references:

General references:

 Expanding FDIC Insurance Past Usual Limits (Television)  from abclocal.go.com
 Keeping Your Cash Safe from washingtonpost.com
 Deposit Program Could Prevent Bank Runs from bizjournals.com
 Money Protection Only Goes So Far, So Know The Risks from chicagotribune.com
''The Wall Street Journal Online:
 Help For Money Funds 
 Your Cash: How Safe is Safe? 
  Banks Spread Deposits, and Risks: Multibank System Meets FDIC Limit, but Rates are Lower
 Covering Your Butt If the Bank Goes Bust from forbes.com
 Six Ideas for Insuring Your Deposits from cnbc.com

External links
 CDARS official website

Federal Deposit Insurance Corporation
Financial services in the United States
Retail financial services
Banking in the United States
Bank deposits